Pearl of the Orient may refer to:

Places

Pearl of the Orient Seas, the historical and sobriquet for the Philippines.
Manila, the capital of the Philippines, historically called the "Perla del Oriente" since 1751.
Shanghai, the most populous city of China.
Hong Kong, a special administrative region of China.
Penang, one of the federal states of Malaysia.
Saigon, the capital of former South Vietnam and also the most populous city of Vietnam.
Sri Lanka, in South Asia
Goa, a small coastal state in India.
Phnom Penh, the capital of Cambodia.

Other uses
Oriental Pearl Tower, a radio and TV tower in Shanghai, China
Pearl of the Orient Tower, a residential skyscraper located in Manila, Philippines
"Pearl of the Orient" (song), 1991 song written by Lo Ta-yu
Glittering Days, or Pearl of the Orient in Chinese, 2006 Hong Kong TV programme
Pearl of the Orient (Christopher Nicole), series of books by Christopher Nicole

See also
Oriental Pearl (disambiguation)